Toodyay was an electoral district of the Legislative Council of Western Australia from 1870 to 1890, during the period when the Legislative Council was the sole chamber of the Parliament of Western Australia.

Toodyay was one of the original ten Legislative Council districts created by the Legislative Council Act 1870 (33 Vict, No. 13). The district's boundaries contained large portions of the northern and central Wheatbelt, including the townsites of Toodyay and Northam, among others. The district was bordered by the district of Swan to the south-west, the district of York to the south-east, and the district of Greenough to the north.

Four men represented Toodyay in the Legislative Council between 1870 and 1890, with George Shenton serving the longest (from 1875 to 1890). Shenton and his predecessor, Edward Hamersley, both continued on in the Legislative Council after 1890, as nominated members.

Members

References

Toodyay
1870 establishments in Australia
1890 disestablishments in Australia
Electoral district